The Women's team sprint event of the FIS Nordic World Ski Championships 2015 was held on 22 February 2015.

Results

Semifinals

Semifinal A

Semifinal B

Final
The final was started at 14:30.

References

Women's team sprint
2015 in Swedish women's sport